Francesco Farnese (19 May 1678 – 26 February 1727) reigned as the seventh Farnese Duke of Parma and Piacenza from 1694 until his death. Married to Dorothea Sophia of the Palatinate, his brother Odoardo's widow, to avoid the return of her dowry, Francesco curtailed court expenditure, enormous under his father and predecessor, Ranuccio II, while preventing the occupation of his Duchy of Parma, nominally a Papal fief, during the War of the Spanish Succession. 

The second son of Ranuccio II Farnese and Maria d'Este of Modena, the Duke, despite his efforts otherwise, saw Parma declared a fief of the Duchy of Milan, an Austrian province in Italy, towards the end of the war. His inability to produce offspring, combined with his brother Antonio's barrenness, lead to the accession of his niece the Queen of Spain's eldest son, Don Carlos, in 1731.

Biography
The second son of Ranuccio II Farnese and Maria d'Este of Modena, Francesco, born in 1678, ascended to his father's domain at the age of 16 on 11 December 1694. Ranuccio II left Parma, a small, land-locked northern-Italian duchy of little political significance, saturated in debt, largely thanks to his extravagant court. Therefore, rather than see her dowry revert to her brother the Elector Palatine, Francesco married his brother Odoardo's cranky widow, Dorothea Sophia of Neuburg.

In 1700, upon the death of Charles II of Spain without an ostensible heir, the War of the Spanish Succession broke out between France and Austria. Duke Francesco, anxious to keep foreign troops out of his duchy, adopted a policy of neutrality; Prince Eugene of Savoy occupied parts of the Farnese territories, however. When Francesco complained to Prince Eugene's employer, the Austrian Emperor Leopold I, of this, the Emperor replied that he would be duly compensated at a later date. Towards the end of the war, Austria, now ruled by Leopold's son Joseph I, disregarded its promise of reparations and, as part of a concordat with the church, declared Parma its fief.

With the help of Giulio Alberoni, Francesco married his pock-marked niece and stepdaughter, Elisabetta, to Philip V of Spain, the French claimant to the thrones of Spain, in 1714. Francesco wanted Elisabetta's eldest son, Don Carlos, to ascend the Farnese dominions when his brother and heir, Antonio, died. Francesco, therefore, tried to dissuade Antonio from marrying and perpetuating his line, a plan which worked for the duration of Francesco's lifetime. Antonio, though married to Enrichetta d'Este of Modena, died childless in 1731, paving the way for Don Carlos's accession. Don Carlos, however, left Parma four years later for the Kingdom of Naples, bringing with him all the Farnese treasures, including the Ducal Palace's marble staircase.

Ancestors

References

Citations

Bibliography
Armstrong, Edward (1892). Elisabeth Farnese: "The Termagent of Spain". Longmans, Green, & Co: New York.
Solari, Giovanna (1968). The House of Farnese: A Portrait of a Great Family of the Renaissance. Doubleday & Company: New York.
Acton, Harold (1956). The Bourbons of Naples (1734–1825). Methuen & Co: London.
 

|-

1678 births
1727 deaths
Francesco
Francesco
Francesco
Francesco
Burials at the Sanctuary of Santa Maria della Steccata